Balun can refer to:
 Balun - transfers signal between a balanced line and an unbalanced line.
 Balun, Iran, also Bālūn - village.
 Balún Canán - mayan for nine stars.
 Balun (岜伦村) - village in Bapen Township.

People 
 Chas Balun
 Miloslav Balun
 Sonja Balun

See also
 Balonne River - also spelt balun.
 Wynebald de Ballon - also spelt balun.